Mirror Lake or Mirror Lakes may refer to:

Places

North America
 Mirror Lake (California)
 Mirror Lake (Lake Placid), a lake in Lake Placid, Florida
 Lake Mirror (Lakeland), a lake in Lakeland, Florida
 Lake Mirror (Winter Haven), a lake in Winter Haven, Florida
 Mirror Lake (Tuftonboro, New Hampshire), a lake
 Mirror Lake, New Hampshire, a village on the lake in Tuftonboro
 Mirror Lake (New York), one of two lakes in Lake Placid, New York
 Mirror Lake (Ohio), a small lake on campus at Ohio State University
 Mirror Lake (Wallowa County, Oregon)
 Mirror Lake (Clackamas County, Oregon)
 Mirror Lake (Tuschar Mountains), Utah
 Mirror Lake (Uinta Mountains), Utah
 Mirror Lake State Park, Wisconsin

Other
 Espejo Lake (Mirror Lake) in Argentina
 Mirror Lakes, set of lakes in New Zealand
Mirror Lake (镜海, Jìng Hǎi), a lake in Jiuzhaigou, Sichuan, China, casting beautiful reflections of the surroundings when the water is calm

Music
 Mirror Lakes (band), Norwegian band